Rudolf Böttger (4 July 1887 – 28 January 1973) was an Austrian painter. His work was part of the painting event in the art competition at the 1936 Summer Olympics.

References

1887 births
1973 deaths
20th-century Austrian painters
20th-century Austrian male artists
Austrian male painters
Olympic competitors in art competitions
People from Tachov